The 2017 IIHF Challenge Cup of Asia Division I was the fourth IIHF Challenge Cup of Asia Division I tournament, an annual international ice hockey tournament held by the International Ice Hockey Federation (IIHF). It took place between 22 and 25 April 2017 in Kuwait City, Kuwait. The host Kuwait won the tournament and was promoted to the 2018 IIHF Challenge Cup of Asia.

Participants

Standings

External links
Division I Statistics

IIHF Challenge Cup of Asia Division I
IIHF Challenge Cup of Asia Division I
IIHF Challenge Cups of Asia
April 2017 sports events in Asia
International ice hockey competitions hosted by Kuwait